is a railway station and a metro station in Nagata-ku, Kobe, Hyōgo Prefecture, Japan.

Lines
West Japan Railway Company (JR West)
Sanyo Main Line (JR Kobe Line)
Kobe Municipal Subway
Seishin-Yamate Line
Kaigan Line

History
The JR West station opened under JNR ownership on 1 April 1954. After the privatization of JNR in 1987, the station became incorporated into the JR Kobe Line when it began services the next year.

On 17 January 1995, the station was damaged in the Kobe earthquake. The station remained closed for a short amount of time as repairs were taking place. Normal service on the JR Kobe Line resumed on 30 January while the subway resumed operations on 16 February of that year.

In 1996, an elevator and escalator were added to the JR West station as part of the station's renovation following the earthquake.

The Kaigan Line platforms opened on 7 July 2001.

Station numbering was introduced to the JR West platforms in March 2018 with Shin-Nagata being assigned station number JR-A65.

Station layout

JR West
The Sanyo Main Line at Shin-Nagata features five tracks, three of which bypasses the station just to its north and the other two serves the station. East of the station,  the track alignment on the line changes. The two local tracks become the innermost tracks, while the three bypass tracks straddle the local tracks.

Platforms
The Sanyo Main Line platforms are located on an elevated section of the line. It features two side platforms and two tracks. There are additional express tracks just north of the platforms that allow trains to bypass the station.

Kobe Municipal Subway

Platforms

The Seishin-Yamate Line platform is located on the second basement ("B2F") level, and the Kaigan Line platform is located on the third basement ("B3F") level.

Adjacent stations

|-
!colspan=5|West Japan Railway Company (JR West)

References

Sanyō Main Line
Railway stations in Kobe
Stations of Kobe Municipal Subway
Railway stations in Japan opened in 1954